The Hatinh langur (Trachypithecus hatinhensis) is a highly threatened Old World monkey found in limestone forests in Vietnam, primarily in the Quảng Bình Province. A recent survey discovered a small population living in the Quảng Trị Province. Contrary to its name, it is not known from the Hà Tĩnh Province. The local Van Kieu minority refer to this lutung as the 'Con Cung', which roughly translates as "black, cliff-dwelling monkey with a long tail". It resembles the closely related François' langur (T. francoisi), but its white cheek-stripes typically extend behind the ears onto the nape (there are significant individual variations, however), and the overall black colour is non-glossy and has a brownish tinge.

This diurnal, largely arboreal langur is social and typically seen in groups of 2-15, but occasionally groups may number as many as 30 individuals. It has often been considered a subspecies of the François' langur, but was elevated to a full species by Bradon-Jones in 1995, and this was followed by Groves, 2005. Both, however, listed it as a subspecies in 2004, and genetic work suggest it should be considered a subspecies of the Laotian langur (T. laotum). Morphological and genetic data also suggests the Indochinese black langur (T. ebenus) is a morph of the Hatinh langur.

References

Hatinh langur
Mammals of Laos
Mammals of Vietnam
Primates of Southeast Asia
Endangered fauna of Asia
Hatinh langur